Claggain Bay is an inlet on the southeast of Islay, Scotland. A well known walking path follows near to Claggain Bay and continues to Ardtalla.

See also
 Aros Bay

Line notes

References
 Roger Redfern. 1998. Walking in the Hebrides

External links

Landforms of Islay
Bays of Argyll and Bute